GTNW  may refer to:

 Global Thermo-Nuclear War, a video game mode in Call of Duty: Modern Warfare 2
 GTE Northwest, the former name of the company Frontier Communications Northwest